Jacob van der Meersch was governor of Mauritius from 1644 to 1648. He was succeeded by Reinier Por. Before van der Meersch, the governor was Adriaen van der Stel.

During his time as governor, progress was made in the domain of wood-cutting and a 5 kilometer road was built.

Notes

References
http://www.farelli.info/pages_colonies/africa/mauritius.htm 

Dutch Governors of Mauritius
17th-century Dutch colonial governors
Year of birth unknown
Year of death unknown